Moscow City Duma District 7 is one of 45 constituencies in Moscow City Duma. The constituency has covered parts of Northern Moscow since 2014. From 1993-2005 District 7 also was based in Northern Moscow, but it covered parts to the south of its current configuration; from 2005-2014 the constituency was based in Eastern Moscow (it actually overlapped the entirety of State Duma Perovo constituency in 2005-2009).

Members elected

Election results

2001

|-
! colspan=2 style="background-color:#E9E9E9;text-align:left;vertical-align:top;" |Candidate
! style="background-color:#E9E9E9;text-align:left;vertical-align:top;" |Party
! style="background-color:#E9E9E9;text-align:right;" |Votes
! style="background-color:#E9E9E9;text-align:right;" |%
|-
|style="background-color:"|
|align=left|Galina Khovanskaya (incumbent)
|align=left|Yabloko
|
|49.10%
|-
|style="background-color:"|
|align=left|Sergey Nikitin
|align=left|Communist Party
|
|25.20%
|-
|style="background-color:"|
|align=left|Andrey Kuznetsov
|align=left|Independent
|
|11.25%
|-
|style="background-color:#000000"|
|colspan=2 |against all
|
|11.67%
|-
| colspan="5" style="background-color:#E9E9E9;"|
|- style="font-weight:bold"
| colspan="3" style="text-align:left;" | Total
| 
| 100%
|-
| colspan="5" style="background-color:#E9E9E9;"|
|- style="font-weight:bold"
| colspan="4" |Source:
|
|}

2004
The results of the by-election were invalidated due to against all line receiving most votes, another by-election was not scheduled as 2005 election was due to be held in less than a year.

|-
! colspan=2 style="background-color:#E9E9E9;text-align:left;vertical-align:top;" |Candidate
! style="background-color:#E9E9E9;text-align:left;vertical-align:top;" |Party
! style="background-color:#E9E9E9;text-align:right;" |Votes
! style="background-color:#E9E9E9;text-align:right;" |%
|-
|style="background-color:"|
|align=left|Aleksandr Kidyayev
|align=left|United Russia
|
|19.97%
|-
|style="background-color:"|
|align=left|Vladimir Ulas
|align=left|Communist Party
|
|18.28%
|-
|style="background-color:"|
|align=left|Yury Zhukov
|align=left|Independent
|
|15.74%
|-
|style="background-color:"|
|align=left|Aleksey Orlov
|align=left|Independent
|
|14.11%
|-
|style="background-color:"|
|align=left|Andrey Svintsov
|align=left|Liberal Democratic Party
|
|2.20%
|-
|style="background-color:#000000"|
|colspan=2 |against all
|
|25.58%
|-
| colspan="5" style="background-color:#E9E9E9;"|
|- style="font-weight:bold"
| colspan="3" style="text-align:left;" | Total
| 
| 100%
|-
| colspan="5" style="background-color:#E9E9E9;"|
|- style="font-weight:bold"
| colspan="4" |Source:
|
|}

2005

|-
! colspan=2 style="background-color:#E9E9E9;text-align:left;vertical-align:top;" |Candidate
! style="background-color:#E9E9E9;text-align:left;vertical-align:top;" |Party
! style="background-color:#E9E9E9;text-align:right;" |Votes
! style="background-color:#E9E9E9;text-align:right;" |%
|-
|style="background-color:"|
|align=left|Vera Stepanenko (incumbent)
|align=left|United Russia
|
|30.32%
|-
|style="background-color:"|
|align=left|Sergey Loktionov (incumbent)
|align=left|Independent
|
|29.05%
|-
|style="background-color:"|
|align=left|Andrey Kochanov
|align=left|Communist Party
|
|12.97%
|-
|style="background-color:"|
|align=left|Yelena Bogoroditskaya
|align=left|Independent
|
|6.85%
|-
|style="background-color:"|
|align=left|Leonid Kolosov
|align=left|Independent
|
|5.61%
|-
|style="background-color:"|
|align=left|Maksim Sadkovsky
|align=left|Liberal Democratic Party
|
|4.51%
|-
|style="background-color:"|
|align=left|Arkady Muravyev
|align=left|Agrarian Party
|
|4.08%
|-
| colspan="5" style="background-color:#E9E9E9;"|
|- style="font-weight:bold"
| colspan="3" style="text-align:left;" | Total
| 
| 100%
|-
| colspan="5" style="background-color:#E9E9E9;"|
|- style="font-weight:bold"
| colspan="4" |Source:
|
|}

2009

|-
! colspan=2 style="background-color:#E9E9E9;text-align:left;vertical-align:top;" |Candidate
! style="background-color:#E9E9E9;text-align:left;vertical-align:top;" |Party
! style="background-color:#E9E9E9;text-align:right;" |Votes
! style="background-color:#E9E9E9;text-align:right;" |%
|-
|style="background-color:"|
|align=left|Vera Stepanenko (incumbent)
|align=left|United Russia
|
|54.04%
|-
|style="background-color:"|
|align=left|Aleksandr Potapov
|align=left|Communist Party
|
|17.53%
|-
|style="background-color:"|
|align=left|Yevgeny Subbotin
|align=left|A Just Russia
|
|11.60%
|-
|style="background-color:"|
|align=left|Viktor Podobedov
|align=left|Liberal Democratic Party
|
|7.63%
|-
|style="background-color:"|
|align=left|Aleksey Abramov
|align=left|Independent
|
|4.68%
|-
| colspan="5" style="background-color:#E9E9E9;"|
|- style="font-weight:bold"
| colspan="3" style="text-align:left;" | Total
| 
| 100%
|-
| colspan="5" style="background-color:#E9E9E9;"|
|- style="font-weight:bold"
| colspan="4" |Source:
|
|}

2014

|-
! colspan=2 style="background-color:#E9E9E9;text-align:left;vertical-align:top;" |Candidate
! style="background-color:#E9E9E9;text-align:left;vertical-align:top;" |Party
! style="background-color:#E9E9E9;text-align:right;" |Votes
! style="background-color:#E9E9E9;text-align:right;" |%
|-
|style="background-color:"|
|align=left|Nadezhda Perfilova
|align=left|Independent
|
|45.85%
|-
|style="background-color:"|
|align=left|Pyotr Zvyagintsev
|align=left|Communist Party
|
|21.10%
|-
|style="background-color:"|
|align=left|Aleksandr Dunyashev
|align=left|Independent
|
|7.37%
|-
|style="background: #00A650"| 
|align=left|Svetlana Potapova
|align=left|Civilian Power
|
|6.55%
|-
|style="background-color:"|
|align=left|Vladimir Samoshin
|align=left|Yabloko
|
|6.44%
|-
|style="background-color:"|
|align=left|Aleksandr Molochko
|align=left|Liberal Democratic Party
|
|4.45%
|-
|style="background-color:"|
|align=left|Vladimir Khomyakov
|align=left|A Just Russia
|
|4.39%
|-
| colspan="5" style="background-color:#E9E9E9;"|
|- style="font-weight:bold"
| colspan="3" style="text-align:left;" | Total
| 
| 100%
|-
| colspan="5" style="background-color:#E9E9E9;"|
|- style="font-weight:bold"
| colspan="4" |Source:
|
|}

2019

|-
! colspan=2 style="background-color:#E9E9E9;text-align:left;vertical-align:top;" |Candidate
! style="background-color:#E9E9E9;text-align:left;vertical-align:top;" |Party
! style="background-color:#E9E9E9;text-align:right;" |Votes
! style="background-color:#E9E9E9;text-align:right;" |%
|-
|style="background-color:"|
|align=left|Nadezhda Perfilova (incumbent)
|align=left|Independent
|
|35.75%
|-
|style="background-color:"|
|align=left|Pyotr Zvyagintsev
|align=left|Communist Party
|
|35.37%
|-
|style="background-color:"|
|align=left|Anton Verbenkin
|align=left|Liberal Democratic Party
|
|9.34%
|-
|style="background-color:"|
|align=left|Pavel Kushakov
|align=left|A Just Russia
|
|8.67%
|-
|style="background-color:"|
|align=left|Yelena Lugovskaya
|align=left|Communists of Russia
|
|7.44%
|-
| colspan="5" style="background-color:#E9E9E9;"|
|- style="font-weight:bold"
| colspan="3" style="text-align:left;" | Total
| 
| 100%
|-
| colspan="5" style="background-color:#E9E9E9;"|
|- style="font-weight:bold"
| colspan="4" |Source:
|
|}

Notes

References

Moscow City Duma districts